The Sony Cyber-shot DSC-QX30 is an ultrazoom, mobile device-mountable, lens-type compact camera manufactured by Sony. Announced on September 3, 2014, the QX30 is one of Sony's "Smart Lens" cameras, alongside the QX1, QX10 and QX100, that are designed to be specifically used with a smartphone. It has a 1/2.3 inch backside-illuminated Exmor R™ CMOS sensor with 20.4 effective megapixels, sitting behind an ƒ/3.5 (wide) to ƒ/6.3 (telephoto) Sony G Lens. Its highlight feature is its 30x lossless optical zoom. 

Like the other Sony Smart Lens cameras, it is Wi-Fi-controlled using an Android or iOS device though the downloadable Sony Imaging Edge (formerly PlayMemories) Mobile application, utilizing the device's screen as its viewfinder and camera controls, while also serving as additional storage medium via its integrated wireless file transfer feature.

Specifications

Technical specifications

See also
Sony QX series
Sony Cyber-shot
Sony DSC-QX10
Sony DSC-QX100

References

Superzoom cameras
Camera lenses introduced in 2014
DSC-QX30
QX30